Sykies, formerly Sykeai (Συκέαι), is a community and village in the municipal unit of Fyllo, municipality of Palamas, periphery of Karditsa, Thessaly, Greece. As of the census of 2011, the community had a population of 294, while the village had a population of 257. The community has two villages, Sykies and Magoulitsa (Μαγουλίτσα). Within the bounds of Sykies is the site of the ancient city of Asterium.

References

Populated places in Karditsa (regional unit)